Love and Politics can refer to several creative works:
 Love and Politics (play), or Kabale und Liebe, a 1784 play by Friedrich Schiller
 Love and Politics (film), or Love Aur Rajneeti, a 2015 Indian Bhojpuri-language action film